Marie Rose Abousefian is an Armenian actress, writer, researcher, columnist, poet and stage director who has investigated historical literature, poetry and prose, portraying human tragedy, and the Armenian Genocide. She is also involved in researching the topics of national identity, human rights, women's rights and the rights of the Armenian people.

Career
Abousefian studied at the State Academy of Fine Arts of Armenia. She began working at the Arshaluys Theatre. Soon after, she joined the Yerevan Dramatic Theatre (now known as the Hrachya Ghaplanyan Drama Theatre), taking on numerous roles in television, radio, and literary and theatrical shows, filmed by Hayfilm.

In 1983, she emigrated to San Francisco where she continued her career in acting. Here, she begun her "One Woman" shows, (acting as different characters, producing the lighting, set design, music and script). In the meantime, she formed the "Saroyan Theatre" of Hamazkayin, San Francisco, for five years as a producer.

Her career in the performing arts, film and theatre, includes roles as a playwright, director and actress. She has written, produced and published many audio recordings, including dramatisations of the Armenian genocide and the life of writers, musicians and historical figures. Her "One Woman" dramatic performances have toured numerous cities across the Armenia, the United States, Canada, Europe, the Middle East and Australia.

Abousefian's literary works appear in publications in Armenia and throughout the Armenian Diaspora. She frequently writes newspaper articles for Asbarez, Aztag, Azad Or and Horizon Weekly.

She was awarded the Commemorative Gold Medal of Honour by the Ministry of Culture of Armenia in 2010.

In 2013, she was conferred a Doctorate in Literature and Philosophy (Ph.D) by the M. Abeghyan Institute of Literature of the Armenian National Academy of Sciences. Her doctoral thesis was on the ‘’Hundred and One Year Trilogy and The Pierced Pot’’, novels by the 20th century Western Armenian writer, Hagop Oshagan. Her supervisor was Prof. Sergey Sarinyan.

Abousefian is a member of the International Congress of Armenia. She is also a member of the Ararat International Academy of Sciences (AIAS) in Paris, France. In 2015, the AIAS awarded her the 100th Anniversary Medal of the Armenian Genocide. Representing the AIAS, she attends annual World Scientific Congresses in Paris, Geneva and Brussels.

In 2017, she was given the title of "Professor of International Relations and Diplomacy" by the International University of Fundamental Studies (IUFS) in Moscow, Russia.

Works

Filmography 
Abousefian has featured in various Armenian films, acting alongside many well-known actors including Frunzik Mkrtchyan, Avet Avetisyan, Sofiko Chiaureli, Varduhi Varderesyan, Vladimir Msryan and Verjaluys Mirijanyan.

Morgan's Relative / Մորգանի խնամին (1970)
Blonde Plane / Շեկ Ինքնաթիռ (1975)
Arevik (1978)
Oh, Gevorg / Օ՜, Գևորգ (1979)
A Piece of Sky / Կտոր մը երկինք (1980)

Performances 
All stage performances are adapted from original texts to plays by Abousefian. Among her works are:

Ever-Tolling Bell Tower - Paruyr Sevak
From Kars to Troy - Vardges Petrosyan
Krikor Zohrab on the Road to Golgotha
Payrur Sevak's Great Love
Remnants - Hagop Oshagan
Rendezvous with Love
The Bride of Dadrakom - Gostan Zarian
The Madman - Matheos Zarifian
The Pierced Pot - Hagop Oshagan
The Trial of Soghomon Tehlirian
The 40 Days of Musa Dagh - Franz Werfel
This Evening with Vahan Terian
Tigran the Great

Papers 

Reflection of the Armenian Genocide in the works of Hakob Oshagan / Հայոց ցեղասպանության արտացոլումը Հակոբ Օշականի գործերում (2013)
Germany's Responsibility in the Armenian Genocide (2015)
The Importance of National Identity (2016)
The World Needs Peace (2019)
Taniel Varoujan: Life, Work and Times (2019)
Hagop Oshagan: Short Story Reflections on the Armenian Genocide (2022)

Books 

 With Paths of the Mind and Spirit / Հոգու եւ Մտքի Արահետներով (2005)
Hundred and One Year Trilogy / Հարյուր Մեկ Տարվա Եռերգությունը (2011)

References 

Armenian actresses
Armenian stage actresses
Armenian film actresses
Soviet film actresses
Armenian human rights activists
Armenian women's rights activists
Syrian people of Armenian descent
People from Aleppo
Year of birth missing (living people)
Living people